The 1990–91 season of the División de Honor de Futsal was the 2nd season of top-tier futsal in Spain. It was played in two rounds. At first round teams were divided in two groups of 12 teams every one, advancing eight first to second round for title. Four last advanced to second round for permanence.

Regular season

1st round

Group Par

Group Impar

2nd round

Title – Group A

Title – Group B

Title – Group C

Title – Group D

Relegation – Group E

Relegation – Group F

Playoffs

See also
División de Honor de Futsal
Futsal in Spain

External links
1990–91 season at lnfs.es

1990 91
Spain
futsal